The 1944 All-Ireland Senior Camogie Championship was the high point of the 1944 season in Camogie. The championship was won by Dublin, who defeated Antrim by a 17-point margin in the final. Gate receipts were £211.

Structure
The altercation with Dublin over the ban on hockey players re-emerged in 1943 and was compounded by another with Cork over male officials and they withdrew from the Camogie Association. In the absence of Cork, Clare defeated Waterford 3–1 to 3–0 in the Munster final to win their first Munster championship. They failed to score against Dublin in the semi-final while a late goal from Bridie O'Neill gave Antrim a semi-final victory over Galway.

Final
The weekend before the final Dublin travelled to Cork, who had not participated in the championship, and were defeated 3–0 to 1–3. This raised questions about the validity of the championship, as well as Dublin's legality for having played an unaffiliated team. Bishop of Down and Connor, Daniel Mageean threw in the ball between Dublin and Antrim in final.

Final stages

 
 Match Rules
50 minutes
Replay if scores level
Maximum of 3 substitutions

See also
 All-Ireland Senior Hurling Championship
 Wikipedia List of Camogie players
 National Camogie League
 Camogie All Stars Awards
 Ashbourne Cup

References

External links
 Camogie Association
 Historical reports of All Ireland finals
 All-Ireland Senior Camogie Championship: Roll of Honour
 Camogie on facebook
 Camogie on GAA Oral History Project

1944 in camogie
1944